Roba Negousse (10 September 1936 – 14 April 1993) was an Ethiopian sprinter. He competed in the 100 metres at the 1956 Summer Olympics and the 1960 Summer Olympics.

References

External links
 

1936 births
1993 deaths
People from Jijiga
Sportspeople from Somali Region
Ethiopian male sprinters
Olympic athletes of Ethiopia
Athletes (track and field) at the 1956 Summer Olympics
Athletes (track and field) at the 1960 Summer Olympics
20th-century Ethiopian people